The 1940–41 season saw Rochdale compete for their second season in the wartime league. Due to the unequal number of games played by the various teams, the North Regional League was decided on goal average only. Rochdale finished 30th out of 36 clubs.

Statistics
																

|}

Competitions

North Regional League

League War Cup

References

Rochdale A.F.C. seasons
Rochdale